Police United Football club is a Thai defunct football club that was managed by the Royal Thai Police from 1960 to 2008. In 2017, the club merged with BEC Tero Sasana and changed the name to Police Tero F.C. at the beginning of season 2018.

History

1960–2009 
The club was founded as Police Sports Club in 1960. In 1965 the Association celebrated its first and only championship. After a period of inactivity, the club had recorded three relegations and 2 promotions in the last 10 years. They were promoted to the Thailand Premier League in 2006, followed in 2007 by a relegation. The following year, the club missed promotion by a margin of just 4 points of the season and finished in fourth place. Before the 2009 season, the club was renamed 'Royal Thai Police F.C.. This was due to the new requirements by the Thailand Premier League and the AFC, which provides that clubs act as companies and must also be registered as such.

2009–2017
The 2009 Thai Division 1 League was dominated from the outset by Police United. With 65 points from 30 games, the club gained their third promotion, to the Thai Premier League. The team scored a total of 76 goals. Manit Noywech, top striker of the club, reached 24 goals. After the end of the season the team had an awards reception. Chaiyong Khumpiam was named coach of the year, Sompong Yod-Ard as goalkeeper of the year and Manit Noywech striker of the year.

For the 2010 season, the policy could undertake two high-quality players. In midfield were reinforced with the experienced Narongchai Vachiraban and attack with Nantawat Tansopa. The latter was top scorer in the 2008 AFC Champions League. With Goran Zoric another striker was added. Zoric is the first Australian in the Thai Premier League.

In January 2010, the club signed a contract with the company Insee. For the amount of 60 million baht, over a period of three years, the club was nicknamed Insee

The official name of the club is Insee Police United. For the 2010 season, the stadium was changed again. The new home of the club is now the Thammasat Stadium in Pathum Thani Province north of Bangkok.

In 2011, the club signed Thawatchai Damrong-Ongtrakul, former coach of Pattaya United F.C. as a new coach.

In 2014, the club signed Anton Ferdinand brother of English Premier Leagues Manchester United Defender Rio Ferdinand. He did not make an appearance for the club.

In 2017, The club was dissolved and merged with BEC Tero Sasana and became Police Tero Football Club.

Honours
 Thai Division 1 League:
Winner: 1999, 2005, 2009, 2015

 Kor Royal Cup:
Winner: 1965

 Khǒr Royal Cup:
Winner: 1953–54

 League Cup:
Winner: 1989, 1991, 1993

Stadium and locations by season records

Season by season record

P = Played
W = Games won
D = Games drawn
L = Games lost
F = Goals for
A = Goals against
Pts = Points
Pos = Final position
Pos = Final position

TPL = Thai Premier League

QR1 = First Qualifying Round
QR2 = Second Qualifying Round
QR3 = Third Qualifying Round
QR4 = Fourth Qualifying Round
RInt = Intermediate Round
R1 = Round 1
R2 = Round 2
R3 = Round 3

R4 = Round 4
R5 = Round 5
R6 = Round 6
GR = Group Stage
QF = Quarter-finals
SF = Semi-finals
RU = Runners-up
S = Shared
W = Winners

Asian Club Championship

Results

Coaches
Coaches by Years (2006–present)

References

External links
 Official Website
 Official Facebook

 
Defunct football clubs in Thailand
Football clubs in Thailand
Association football clubs established in 1960
1960 establishments in Thailand
Pathum Thani province
Association football clubs disestablished in 2017
2017 disestablishments in Thailand
Police association football clubs in Thailand